Bouhdila is a neighbourhood of Berkane, the capital of Berkane Province in Oriental, Morocco. According to the 2004 census, it had a population of 16,145.

References

Populated places in Berkane Province